Tom Petithomme is a former star for the Arena Football League's San Jose SaberCats and currently holds the fourth highest rushing total in the Arena League's history. Tom currently teaches Physical Education at Central Middle School in San Carlos C.A.

References

San Jose SaberCats players
New Jersey Red Dogs players
Iowa Barnstormers players
Living people
1972 births
San Jose State Spartans football players